Taichung is located in the center of Taiwan's north-south movement, with a population of more than 2.8 million. It is the employment, life and economic center of central Taiwan. Along with the development of industry and commerce, there was a boom in building skyscrapers in Taiwan in the 1990's. At present, there are 54 high-rise buildings built above 120 meters (including roofing and reconstruction) in Taichung City, making it the 1st place in the country.

The first skyscraper in Taichung took shape around this period. Skyscrapers built during this period were mainly distributed on both sides of Section 2 of Taiwan Boulevard(original Taichung Port Road,) at the junction of the West District and North District. The second skyscraper settlement in Taichung is located on the north side of Taichung's 7th Redevelopment Zone in Xitun District. At present, almost all tall buildings over 120 meters are in this area. There are 35 buildings that have been completed and topped out(2021.) more than two-thirds of the city's tall buildings above 120 meters are in this area.

Currently, the tallest building in Taichung is the 47–story The Landmark (Taichung), which rises  and was completed in 2018.

There are currently several skyscrapers under construction or proposed in Taichung, including the Taichung Commercial Bank Headquarters, which is under construction and will reach  when completed in 2023  and the Intelligence Operation Center, which is currently under planning and will reach .

Tallest Buildings in Taichung
As of September 2020, the list of buildings in Taichung at least  meters high is as follows according to Emporis, Skyscraperpage and the Council on Tall Buildings and Urban Habitat. An equal sign (=) following a rank indicates the same height between two or more buildings. The "Year" column indicates the year of completion. The list includes only habitable buildings, as opposed to structures such as observation towers, radio masts, transmission towers and chimneys.

Tallest Buildings under construction/ proposed

Timeline of tallest buildings

See also
 Skyscraper
 List of tallest buildings
 List of tallest buildings in Taiwan
 List of tallest buildings in New Taipei City
 List of tallest buildings in Taipei
 List of tallest buildings in Kaohsiung

References

External links
 Tallest buildings in Taichung on Emporis
 Tallest Buildings in Taichung on The Skyscraper Center

Taichung